Workers' Memorial is a sculpture in Indiana, United States by artist Daniel Edwards made to commemorate workers who have died on the job. The memorial consists of three bronze workers standing atop a limestone base. The statue was unveiled in 1995 on April 28, a day on which labor groups in Indianopolis annually commemorate fallen workers. Sponsored by the American Federation of Labor and Congress of Industrial Organizations (AFL–CIO), labor groups paid the entire $40,000 cost of the memorial.

Description
Workers' Memorial depicts three bronze industrial workers standing atop a limestone base. Two of the workers are male and one is female.  The bases of the proper right and the proper left workers are inscribed "D. EDWARDS 1995." The base of the center worker is inscribed with the names of people who helped create the statue, including design consultant Steve Mannheimer and carver Henry Conway. The sculptures were cast by the Scott Art Casting foundry.  The inscription on the front of the base reads:
IN MEMORY OF ALL INDIANA / WORKERS WHO HAVE DIED AT WORK / OR AS A RESULT OF THEIR LABOR / DEDICATED / THIS WORKER MEMORIAL DAY / APRIL 28, 1995.
On the back of the base are plaques of several Indiana labor groups.

The memorial is located on the west side of the Indiana Government Center on West Street in Indianapolis, Indiana.

Artist
Artist Daniel Edwards was born in La Porte, Indiana in 1965. He is an alumnus and former professor of the Herron School of Art. His other works of art in Indianapolis include The Landmark for Peace Memorial and several bronze bust portraitures housed in the National Art Museum of Sport. His most well-known works are often considered controversial and address celebrity and popular culture, including Britney Spears, Oprah Winfrey, Fidel Castro and Paris Hilton as subjects.

See also
 Indiana Law Enforcement and Firefighter Memorial
 The Muster Point

References

External links
 
 View more photos of this piece and other artwork found at the Indiana Statehouse on Flickr

Outdoor sculptures in Indianapolis
1995 sculptures
Bronze sculptures in Indiana
Monuments and memorials in Indiana
Indiana Statehouse Public Art Collection
Labor monuments and memorials in the United States